The golden-bellied mangabey (Cercocebus chrysogaster) is a social Old World monkey found in swampy, humid forests south of the Congo River in the Democratic Republic of the Congo. It was previously considered a subspecies of the agile mangabey (C. agilis).
Little is published about the species and its behaviour has only been studied in captivity.

The only known photograph of golden-bellied mangabeys in the wild is shown in this article and a link to a video can be found in  "External links" below.

References

External links 
 Only known footage of golden-bellied mangabeys in the wild

Only known footage: J.M.Stritch: http://cornwallcameratrapping.blogspot.co.uk/2014/07/only-know-footage-of-wild-golden.html

golden-bellied mangabey
Endemic fauna of the Democratic Republic of the Congo
Mammals of the Democratic Republic of the Congo
golden-bellied mangabey